Dehydrocholic acid is a synthetic bile acid, manufactured by the oxidation of cholic acid. It acts as a hydrocholeretic, increasing bile output to clear increased bile acid load.

References

Bile acids
Cholanes
Ketones